The 2012 Arab Cup was the ninth edition of the Arab Cup for national football teams affiliated with the Union of Arab Football Associations (UAFA).

The tournament was hosted by Saudi Arabia between 22 June and 6 July 2012. It is the second time that the nation has hosted the tournament, the first being in 1985.  This edition witnessed the return of Iraq – the most successful team and record holder of the Arab Cup with four titles – after a 25-year absence due to the Gulf War.

Prize money
The tournament's lead sponsor was Singaporean company World Sport Group who describe themselves as "Asia's leading sports marketing, media and event management company."

The winner received USD$1million, the runner-up received $600,000, the third-placed team received $300,000, while the other participating football associations received $200,000 each.

Teams

Participating

 Bold indicates champion for that year
1Libya were due to send their under-21 team but instead sent its senior national team.

Did not enter

Africa
 
 
 
 
 
 

Asia

Draw
The official draw was held on 6 May 2012 in Jeddah, Saudi Arabia. The remaining 11 teams were ranked based on the FIFA World Rankings of May 2012 before the draw.

The United Arab Emirates withdrew from the competition after the group draw had been made; they were initially drawn into group A.

It will be played as tournament with three groups made of four teams each. The organizer country, Saudi Arabia was assigned to Group A.

Venues

Match officials
The following referees were chosen for the 2012 Arab Cup.

Referees

  Djamel Haimoudi
  Nawaf Shukralla
  Mahmoud Ashour
  Gehad Grisha
  Suleiman Dalqam
  Redouane Jaid
  Abdullah Al-Baloushi
  Abdulrahman Al-Amri
  Khalid Abdel Rahman
  Selim Jedidi
  Hamad Al-Shaikh Hashmi

Assistant referees

  Abdelhak Etchiali
  Aziz Ali Hasan Al-Wadi
  Ayman Dagesh
  Sherif Saleh
  Ahmad Al-Ruwaili
  Fouad Al-Maghribi
  Bouazza Rouani
  Ramzan Al-Nuaimi
  Abdulaziz Al-Asmari
  Waleed Ali Ahmad
  Bechir Hassani
  Ahmed Mohammed Saeed Al-Shamisi
  Ahmed Qaid Saif

Squads

Group stage

Group A

Group B

Group C

Best placed runner-up
The team that finish highest of all group runners-up will also proceed to the semi-final stage. Due to Group A only having three teams in their group, results against teams finishing fourth will not be counted. The best runners-up will face the winner of group A in the semifinals while the winner of group B will face the winner of group C.

Knockout phase

The semi-final winners proceed to the final and those who lost compete in the third place playoff.

Semi-finals

Third place play-off

Final

Winners

Statistics

Goalscorers

Awards
 Yassine Salhi – was named the player of the tournament, and was the top scorer of the tournament with a total of 6 goals.

Team statistics

|-
|colspan="10"|Eliminated in the group stage
|-

Media

Broadcasting

References

 
Arab Cup
2012
Arab Cup
2012 in Asian football
Arab Cup
June 2012 sports events in Asia
July 2012 sports events in Asia